The  is one of the cabinet-level ministries of the Japanese government. The ministry was named the  until 2001.

Overview 

It is said that new ministry employees are subtly reminded that the Ōkura-shō predates by some 1269 years when the new Constitution was imposed on the nation by the U.S. occupation forces in 1947.

The Ministry has long been regarded as the most powerful ministry in the Japanese government. After various financial scandals revealed in the 1990s, however, the Ministry lost its power over banking supervision to a newly established Financial Services Agency. It also lost most of its control over monetary policy to the Bank of Japan when the Diet passed a new Bank of Japan Law in 1998.

In financial markets, the Ministry is famous for its active foreign exchange policy. Its top civil servant on the international side, Vice Minister of Finance for International Affairs, is often quoted in the financial press. Former Vice Minister Eisuke Sakakibara was known as "Mr Yen", whereas his successors Haruhiko Kuroda and Zenbei Mizoguchi were often referred to as "Mr. Asian Currency" and "Mr. Dollar", respectively.

Toshio Akagi's wife performed the signature activity of a request for a re-investigation request to investigate the truth about the suicide of a staff member of Kinki Finance Bureau of the Ministry of Finance who was forced to tamper with official documents in relation to the Mori friend case, the fastest record ever in Japan The signatures of 260,000 people gathered, resulting in a total of 300,000 signatures.

Organizational structure 

The Ministry is organized in six bureaus that provide the overall functions of the ministry:
 Minister's Secretariat
 Budget Bureau
 Tax Bureau
 Customs and Tariff Bureau
 Financial Bureau
 International Bureau

Independent Administrative Institutions
Six Independent Administrative Institutions are under the Ministry's control:
Japan Mint
National Printing Bureau
National Research Institute of Brewing
Nippon Automated Cargo Clearance System
Commemorative Organization for the Japan World Exposition '70
Japan Housing Finance Agency

Incidents
On May 20 2022, the deputy vice minister for policy planning and coordination in the Ministry of Finance was arrested for beating and kicking a fellow passenger on a train in Tokyo.

See also

 Minister of Finance (Japan)
 Monetary and fiscal policy of Japan
 Ministry of International Trade and Industry
 National Tax Agency

References

 Hartcher. (1998) The Ministry: The Inside Story of Japan's Ministry of Finance. New York: HarperCollins.  .

Further reading
  1901-

External links

 Official website

Finance
Japan
 
Anti-dumping authorities
2001 establishments in Japan
Customs services